ASTERIX (short for All Purpose Structured Eurocontrol Surveillance Information Exchange) is a standard for the exchange of air traffic services (ATS) information. It is developed and maintained by the European ATS organization Eurocontrol. ASTERIX is surveillance data format which is being adopted by the world users community as the universal standard in this domain today.

ASTERIX is an extensible standard with a number of different categories, each of which deals with one particular kind of information. These include target reports from surveillance sensors such as radars as well as processed information such as aircraft tracks and various system status messages. Each category defines a number of data items which can be transmitted in a message. Which of these items are transmitted is defined in a User Application Profile (UAP), usually the default UAP provided by the standard document for the category, but optionally a more specialised UAP negotiated between sender and receiver separately.

Each system/sensor using the ASTERIX data format is assigned a unique identifier composed of two 8 bit values, the System Area Code (SAC) and the System Identification Code (SIC). The ANSP selects the SIC, but the SAC is assigned globally to system operators by Eurocontrol (see external link).

External links 
 ASTERIX page at Eurocontrol
 System Area Codes (SAC) List (worldwide)
 AsterixInspector open source software displays the contents of ASTERIX files
 ASTERIX Toolkit free software that can record, replay, decode and display the ASTERIX data.
 RAPS-3, commercial tool to validate ASTERIX conformance (among other functionality)
 OpenATS jASTERIX open source library (C++), decodes into JSON (GitHub)
 OpenATS COMPASS open source air-traffic surveillance data display (GitHub)
 asterix-specs open source asterix specifications in structured formats, including json (GitHub)

Air traffic control systems
Telecommunications-related introductions in 1988